Ma Ding (born 24 April 1957) is a Chinese obstetrician and gynecologist who is director of Department of Obstetrics and Gynecology, Tongji Medical College of HUST, and an academician of the Chinese Academy of Engineering.

Biography 
Ma was born into a medical family in Kunming, Yunnan, on 24 April 1957. He has five siblings. He earned a bachelor's degree in 1982, a master's degree in 1986, and a doctor's degree in 1990, all from Tongji Medical College of HUST. He carried out postdoctoral research at the University of Texas in March 1992 and was assistant professor at the university from January 1995 to November 1997.

Ma returned to China in November 1997 and became director of Department of Obstetrics and Gynecology, Tongji Medical College of HUST.

Honours and awards 
 2010 State Science and Technology Progress Award (Second Class)
 2011 State Science and Technology Progress Award (Second Class)
 2012 State Science and Technology Progress Award (Second Class)
 2015 Science and Technology Progress Award of the Ho Leung Ho Lee Foundation
 27 November 2017 Member of the Chinese Academy of Engineering (CAE)

References 

1957 births
Living people
People from Kunming
Engineers from Yunnan
Tongji University alumni
Chinese gynaecologists
Chinese obstetricians
Members of the Chinese Academy of Engineering